Dinea Island is the flat rocky island off the north coast of Greenwich Island in the South Shetland Islands extending 290 m in north-northwest to south-southeast direction and 130 m wide.  The area was visited by early 19th century sealers.

The island is named after the ancient Roman fortress of Dinea in Northeastern Bulgaria.

Location
Bulgarian mapping in 2009.

Maps
 L.L. Ivanov. Antarctica: Livingston Island and Greenwich, Robert, Snow and Smith Islands. Scale 1:120000 topographic map. Troyan: Manfred Wörner Foundation, 2009.  (Second edition 2010)
Antarctic Digital Database (ADD). Scale 1:250000 topographic map of Antarctica. Scientific Committee on Antarctic Research (SCAR). Since 1993, regularly upgraded and updated.

References
 Bulgarian Antarctic Gazetteer. Antarctic Place-names Commission. (details in Bulgarian, basic data in English)
 Dinea Island. SCAR Composite Antarctic Gazetteer.

External links
 Dinea Island. Copernix satellite image

Islands of the South Shetland Islands
Bulgaria and the Antarctic